Domenico Girardi (born 2 May 1985 in Terzigno) is an Italian professional football player currently playing for Pomigliano.

References

External links
 
 

1985 births
Living people
Italian footballers
Serie B players
A.C. Bellaria Igea Marina players
U.S. Salernitana 1919 players
Benevento Calcio players
A.C. Prato players
Hellas Verona F.C. players
Modena F.C. players
Taranto F.C. 1927 players
Paganese Calcio 1926 players
F.C. Matera players
A.S.D. Nocerina 1910 players
Association football forwards